G&S may refer to:

 Gilbert and Sullivan, a 19th-century comic opera partnership
 Gavin & Stacey, a BBC comedy TV series
 Geek & Sundry, a commercial YouTube Channel and multimedia production company.
 Graham & Schlageter, an American sailboat design firm active from 1975 to 1989